The Lunacy (Scotland) Act 1857 formed mental health law in Scotland from 1857 until 1913.

Background
Prior to the Lunacy (Scotland) Act, lunacy legislation in Scotland was enshrined in the Madhouses (Scotland) Act 1815 which established the right of Scottish Sheriffs to order the inspection of madhouses. However the Scottish Lunacy Commission inquiry which reported in 1857 found that the official oversight of mental health institutions "remained at best variable and at worst simply inadequate". It recommended the formation of a "Scottish Lunacy Board" who would address the shortfall in oversight.

Provisions
The legislation created a General Board of Commissioners in Lunacy for Scotland. It also created district boards with the power to establish and operate publicly funded "district asylums" for patients who could not afford the fees charged by existing private and charitable "Royal Asylums". These existing "Royal Asylums" (with Royal Charters) included the Aberdeen Royal Lunatic Asylum, the Crichton Royal Institution, the Dundee Royal Lunatic Asylum, the Royal Edinburgh Lunatic Asylum, the Glasgow Royal Lunatic Asylum, the Montrose Royal Lunatic Asylum and James Murray's Royal Lunatic Asylum. The aim of the legislation was to establish a network of "district asylums" with coverage throughout Scotland.

Subsequent legislation
Under the Mental Deficiency and Lunacy (Scotland) Act 1913, the General Board of Commissioners in Lunacy for Scotland was reconstructed and designated the General Board of Control for Scotland.

See also
List of asylums commissioned in Scotland

References

Sources

1857 in British law
United Kingdom Acts of Parliament 1857
Acts of the Parliament of the United Kingdom concerning Scotland
Legal history of Scotland
Mental health legal history of the United Kingdom